George Duncan (16 September 1883 – 15 January 1964) was a Scottish professional golfer. He was also a golf course designer. His much sought-after professional teaching and swing analysis skills lead to him being referred to as "the pro's pro." He won the 1920 Open Championship.

Early life
Duncan was born in Methlick, Aberdeenshire, Scotland, on 16 September 1883. He was first apprenticed as a carpenter and rejected a chance to become a professional footballer at Aberdeen to become a golf professional.

Golf career
Duncan was well known for his fast pace of play; he would simply walk to his ball, drop his limbs into his stance immediately, and hit the ball. If he ever studied the line and shape of his shot, he had done it before he reached his ball, for there was no pause when he got to it. As for practice swings, he regarded them as totally unnecessary and barely legal – close to practising on the course.

1920 Open Championship

In 1920, he won the first post World War I Open Championship at Royal Cinque Ports in Kent, in one of the greatest comebacks in Open Championship history. After shooting 80 in his first two rounds, Duncan was thirteen shots behind the leader, Abe Mitchell, before the final two rounds were played, but made up the deficit to win by two shots from Sandy Herd. His rounds were 80-80-71-72=303. He is the last player to win a golf major with a score of 80 for a round.

1922 Open Championship
Although he did not win the British Open in 1922, his third round of that Open was included as one of the 25 greatest rounds of golf ever played in the Guinness Book of Golf Records Facts and Champions. His third round 69 was only the third round shot under 70 in British Open history; a major achievement given the limitations of the golf technology of the day. He just failed to win the 1922 Open, eventually losing to Walter Hagen by a margin of one stroke. The scene of his demise was a dip in the fairway in front of the 18th green from which he fluffed a chip shot to a position five yards short of the pin. He eventually missed the crucial putt for a tie with Hagen, which led to the short position in front of the 18th being ironically named "Duncan's Hollow."

Ryder Cup
He played for Great Britain in the Ryder Cup in 1927, 1929, and 1931. He was playing captain in 1929 when Great Britain was the victorious side.

Death and legacy
Duncan died on 15 January 1964 in Leeds, England. He is best remembered for winning the 1920 Open Championship.

Tournament wins (22)
Note: This list may be incomplete.
 1906 Leeds Cup
 1908 London Professional Foursomes Tournament (with Charles Mayo), Manchester Tournament
 1909 North Berwick Tournament
 1912 Sphere and Tatler Foursomes Tournament (with James Sherlock), Belgian Open
 1913 News of the World Match Play, French Open
 1914 Bishop's Stortford Tournament, Port Seton Professional Tournament
 1919 Killermont Tournament, St Andrews Tournament ("Victory Open") (joint winner with Abe Mitchell)
 1920 The Open Championship, Roehampton Invitation Tournament, Daily Mail Tournament, Glasgow Herald Tournament
 1922 Daily Mail Tournament
 1923 Tooting Bec Cup
 1924 Glasgow Herald Tournament
 1927 Irish Open, French Open
 1929 Frinton Invitation Tournament

Major championship is shown in bold.

Major championships

Wins (1)

Results timeline

Note: Duncan only played in The Open Championship and the U.S. Open.

NT = No tournament
CUT = missed the half-way cut
"T" indicates a tie for a place

Team appearances
 England–Scotland Professional Match (representing Scotland): 1903 (winners), 1906, 1907, 1909, 1910, 1912 (tie), 1913, 1932, 1934, 1935, 1936, 1937
 Coronation Match (representing the Professionals): 1911 (winners)
 Great Britain vs USA (representing Great Britain): 1921 (winners, captain), 1926 (winners)
 Ryder Cup (representing Great Britain): 1927, 1929 (winners, captain), 1931

References

External links 
The New Manadarins of Golf from Vanity Fair, July 1921

Scottish male golfers
Winners of men's major golf championships
Ryder Cup competitors for Europe
Golf course architects
Sportspeople from Aberdeenshire
People from Formartine
1883 births
1964 deaths